Laudakia melanura, also known as the black agama or black rock agama, is a species of agamid lizard. It is found in Iran, Afghanistan, Pakistan, and northern India.

There are three subspecies:
 Laudakia melanura melanura (Blyth, 1854) – southeastern Iran, southeastern Afghanistan, and Pakistan (Salt Range in northern Punjab (type locality), northwestern Frontier Province, western Sindh, western Balochistan)
 Laudakia melanura nasiri Baig, 1999 – endemic to southern Pakistan (Toba Kakar Range, Balochistan)
 Laudakia melanura lirata (Blanford, 1874) – Pakistan, Iran

References

Further reading
 Ananjeva, N.B. & Tuniev 1994 Some aspects of historical biogeography of Asian rock agamids Russ. J. Herpetol. 1 (1): 43
 Blyth, E. 1854 Proceedings of the Society. Report of the Curator, Zoological Department. J. Asiat. Soc. Bengal  23 [1854]: 737-740

Laudakia
Lizards of Asia
Reptiles of Afghanistan
Reptiles of India
Reptiles of Iran
Reptiles of Pakistan
Reptiles described in 1854
Taxa named by Edward Blyth